Emotions is the fourth studio album by American singer Brenda Lee. The album was released on April 3, 1961 on Decca Records and was produced by Owen Bradley. It was one of two studio albums released by Lee in 1961 and its title track became a Top 10 hit on the Billboard Hot 100 the same year.

Background and content 
Emotions was recorded in seven sessions between August 16, 1960 and January 19, 1961 all at the Bradley Film and Recording Studio located in Nashville, Tennessee, United States. Like Lee's previously released This Is...Brenda, the album's production mixed the sounds of Rockabilly with the Nashville Sound production, according to Richie Unterberger of Allmusic. Seven of the album's twelve tracks were cover versions. The album's eighth track "Will You Love Me Tomorrow" was a remake of the single by The Shirelles and the songs "Georgia on My Mind" and "Swanee River Rock" were previously recorded by Ray Charles. While Unterberger found that the songs seemed to be on the "filler side", he still felt that Lee "brought commitment to each and every one of her vocals." Also included on the album was two songs co-written by American country artist Mel Tillis: "Emotions" and "Crazy Talk". The album received four out of five stars from reviewer Richie Unterberger, who stated, "While it was the kind of record that could appeal to both kids and adults, it wasn't watered down, as the production on its own was pretty delightful to listen to, matched by the excellence of Lee's incredibly (for a teenager) mature vocals." Emotions was issued originally as an LP record upon its initial release, with six songs on each side of the record. The album has been reissued and released on a compact disc in the United Kingdom.

Release 
Prior to the album's release the tracks "Emotions" and "I'm Learning About Love" had been issued on a single in December 1960: "Emotions", written by Mel Tillis and Ramsey Kearney, had been the favored side reaching #7 in February 1961 although "I'm Learning About Love" also became a Top 40 hit peaking at #33. while also reaching #45 on the UK Singles Chart. The album was officially released on April 3, 1961 on Decca Records and peaked at #24 on the Billboard 200 album chart, becoming Lee's first album not to peak in the Billboard 200 Top 10.

Track listing 
Side one
"Emotions" – (Ramsey Kearney, Mel Tillis) - 2:51
"Just Another Lie" – (Ernest R. Suarez) - 3:20
"If You Love Me (Really Love Me)" – (Marguerite Monnot, Geoff Parsons, Edith Piaf) - 2:40
"Crazy Talk" – (Mel Tillis, Wayne P. Walker) - 2:42
"When I Fall in Love" – (Edward Heyman, Victor Young) - 3:01
"Around the World" – (Harold Adamson, Victor Young) - 2:23

Side two
"Swanee River Rock" – (Ray Charles) - 2:07
"Will You Love Me Tomorrow" – (Gerry Goffin, Carole King) - 2:54
"I'm Learning About Love" – (Louis Innis, Grady Martin) - 2:41
"Georgia on My Mind" – (Hoagy Carmichael, Stuart Gorrell) - 3:39
"Cry" – (Churchill Kohlman) - 2:49
"I'm in the Mood for Love" – (Dorothy Fields, Jimmy McHugh) - 2:48

Personnel 
 Brenton Banks – strings
 Harold Bradley – guitar
 Howard Carpenter – strings
 Floyd Cramer – piano
 Dottie Dillard – background vocals
 Ray Edenton – guitar
 Buddy Emmons – steel guitar
 Buddy Harman – drums
 Lillian Hunt – strings
 Anita Kerr – background vocals
 Brenda Lee – lead vocals
 Grady Martin – guitar
 Bob Moore – bass
 Louis Nunley – background vocals
 Boots Randolph – saxophone
 Vernel Richardson – strings
 Bill Wright – background vocals

Sales chart positions 
Album

Singles

References 

1961 albums
Brenda Lee albums
Albums produced by Owen Bradley
Decca Records albums